Vallès Occidental is a comarca (county) in Catalonia, Spain. Sabadell and Terrassa are the comarcal capitals. Along with Vallès Oriental it forms the grand comarca of Vallès, and is part of the Barcelona metropolitan area.

Physical geography 

Vallès Occidental borders the comarques of Bages (to the north), Vallès Oriental (to the north and east), Baix Llobregat (to the west), and Barcelonès (to the south). It centers on the Catalan prelittoral depression, limited to the west by the River Llobregat and to the east by the River Caldes. The northern part of the comarca is mountainous. From west to east, it contains part of the Obac range (924m altitude at Castellsapera); the massifs of Sant Llorenç de Munt (1095m at La Mola and 1053m at Montcau) and Puig de la Creu (664m); and the Sant Sadurní (954m) and Farell cliffs (789m). At the south of the comarca is the Collserola range (512m), which forms part of the Catalan Littoral. Between these various ranges is the valley that gives its name to the comarca.
The valley actually composes two separate watersheds, the basins of the Llobregat and Besòs.

The Llobregat watershed lies to the west of the axis that runs from Obac to Tibidabo (culminating point of the Collserola range), passing through Matadepera, Sant Quirze del Vallès, Bellaterra, and Sant Cugat del Vallès. Tributaries of the Llobregat  include the Canyamssos, the Rubí and the Vallvidrera. East of that axis, the watershed of the Besòs includes the rivers Ripoll and Caldes, (the latter forming the eastern border of the comarca).

Major natural parks 
 Parc Natural de Sant Llorenç de Munt i Serra de l'Obac
 Parc de Collserola

Hiking trails 
Vallès Occidental has several notable official hiking trails, known as 
"senders de gran recorregut".

 GR-6: Barcelona – Montserrat (Classic route to Montserrat).
 GR-96: Barcelona – Montserrat (Roman road to Montserrat).
 GR-97: Abrera – Sant Celoni (From the Llobregat to the Tordera).
 GR-173: Circumnavigation of Vallès Occidental.

Human and economic geography
Industry is concentrated in the south, coinciding with the flattest land in the comarca. The principal industrial cities are the co-capitals Sabadell and Terrassa, as well as Rubí and Cerdanyola del Vallès. The most important industries are textiles, mechanical engineering, metallurgy, machinery, electrical equipment, construction, chemicals, paper, and the processing of food products. An industrial crisis at the end of the 1970s and the beginning of the 1980s led to a greater importance for the commercial and service sectors, especially computer-related work.

The north remains primarily rural. Many of the residences there now function as second homes.

Municipalities

Transportation 
Much of Catalonia's transportation network passes through Vallès Occidental, with roads, railroads, etc. crossing the valley in various directions.

Motorways
 AP-7 crosses Vallès in an east-west direction. Heading west, it connects Vallès with Tarragona, València and the southern part of the Iberian Peninsula, similarly to the A-2/AP-2 (which connects Barcelona, Lleida, and Zaragoza). Heading east, it connects Vallès with the province of Girona and with France.
 C-58 crosses the comarca south to north, connecting Barcelona with Manresa by wy of Montcada i Reixac, Ripollet, Cerdanyola del Vallès, Sabadell, and Terrassa.
 Manresa, Terrassa, and Barcelona are also connected by C-16 or the Vallvidrera Tunnels, by way of Sant Cugat del Vallès and Rubí.
 C-33 connects Montcada i Reixac and Mollet del Vallès, connecting the northern part of Barcelona with autopista AP-7 to the northeast.

Highways
 N-150, the principal highway of the comarca, crosses south to north, connecting Barcelona to Terrassa by way of Montcada i Reixac, Ripollet, Cerdanyola del Vallès, Barberà del Vallès, and Sabadell. Beyond Terrassa, various carreteres comarcals complete the comarca's network:
 C-1413 starts at Molins de Rei, connects to the N-II and N-340 and the motorway A-2, and passes through Rubí, Sabadell, and Sentmenat before connecting finally to the N-152 at the heights of Centelles.
 C-1415 connects Vilafranca del Penedès (N-340), Sant Sadurní d'Anoia, and Martorell (A-7, N-II) to Granollers and Mataró (N-II, A-19) passing through  Terrassa, Matadepera, Castellar del Vallès, and Sentmenat.
 C-155 connects Sabadell to Granollers, passing through Polinyà and Palau de Plegamans.

Railroads
Both railroad companies that operate in Catalonia have lines in Vallès Occidental. Renfe's Barcelona-Lleida line passes through Manresa.
The Ferrocarrils de la Generalitat de Catalunya have the "Metro del Vallès", connecting Barcelona to Sabadell and Terrassa.

Airports
Most air traffic for Vallès Occidental comes through Prat airport in neighboring Baix Llobregat. Sabadell Airport is used for sport flying, as a base for firemen, and for air freight.

References

External links 
Official comarcal web site (in Catalan)

 
Vallès
Comarques of the Province of Barcelona